Stocksfield is a railway station on the Tyne Valley Line, which runs between  and  via . It is owned by Network Rail and managed by Northern Trains.

History
The Newcastle and Carlisle Railway was formed in 1829, and was opened in stages.

Stocksfield was reduced to an unstaffed halt in 1967, along with most of the other stations on the line that escaped the Beeching Axe. The former station buildings were subsequently demolished.

Facilities
The station has two platforms, both of which have seating, a waiting shelter and next train audio and visual displays. The westbound platform has a ticket machine, which accepts card or contactless payment only, and an emergency help point. Platforms are linked by a pre-grouping metal footbridge, similar to those at Riding Mill and Wylam, however there is step-free access to both platforms via the nearby road bridge. There is a small car park and cycle storage at the station.

Stocksfield is part of the Northern Trains penalty fare network, meaning that a valid ticket or promise to pay notice is required prior to boarding the train.

Services

All services are operated by Northern Trains.

Rolling stock used: Class 156 Super Sprinter and Class 158 Express Sprinter

References

External links
 
 

Railway stations in Northumberland
DfT Category F2 stations
Former North Eastern Railway (UK) stations
Railway stations in Great Britain opened in 1835
Northern franchise railway stations